The Terrible Truth is a 1951 American anti-drug documentary film created by Sid Davis Productions.

Summary
The film contained messages such as "marijuana has similar properties to amphetamines" and "the Soviet Union was pushing drugs in America". The film follows William B. McKesson (to become Los Angeles County District Attorney in 1956) who interviews a young woman about her use of marijuana as a gateway drug to intravenous use of heroin. McKesson states at the end of the film "Some say that the Reds are promoting drug traffic in the United States to undermine national morale."

Reception and legacy
The film has been called "faux documentary ... ironic, naïve, campy", and according to Edward Brunner in Postmodern Culture, one of the "scandalous examples of how thoroughly the media environment has been penetrated by schemes for social engineering". It can be found alongside famously bad movies like Reefer Madness on popular film lists, for example those found at thefix.com as one of the five worst anti-drug works of the past century, and The Atlantic where it is described as "hysterical" and "cartoonish".

The film is included in the Prelinger Archives, a scholarly collection of film related to U.S. history.

References

Book sources

External links
The Terrible Truth at Internet Archive (public domain)

The Terrible Truth on Dailymotion

1951 films
American films about cannabis
American social guidance and drug education films
1950s American films
1950s independent films
American short films